Seppo Juhani Irjala (2 December 1937 – 7 September 2004) was a Finnish sports shooter. He competed in the 50 metre pistol event at the 1972 Summer Olympics.

References

External links
 

1937 births
2004 deaths
Finnish male sport shooters
Olympic shooters of Finland
Shooters at the 1972 Summer Olympics
Sportspeople from Oulu